Mid-States Football Association
Minnesota Sports Facilities Authority